Nagarjuna G. (Nagarjuna Gadiraju) works in the Homi Bhabha Centre for Science Education, Tata Institute of Fundamental Research in Mumbai, India. His major research interests include Science Education, Cognitive Science, History and Philosophy of Science and Structure and Dynamics of Knowledge. As an activist he focuses on  promoting free knowledge and free
software and serves as the chairperson of Free Software Foundation of India.

Biography 
Nagarjuna was born in 1960 at Nagarjuna Sagar, in Andhra Pradesh, India.

Education 
Nagarjuna did M.Sc. in Biology and M.A. in Philosophy from Mumbai and Ph.D. in Philosophy of Science from IIT Kanpur.

Work 
Some of his areas of interest are semantic web, knowledge organization, AI, philosophy of science, biological roots of
knowledge and modelling complex systems with specific interest in cognitive development. He is the author of a specification and
implementation of a distributed knowledge base called GNOWSYS. He is an architect of gnowledge.org, a community portal, which was launched on 2 February 2007. He contributed as a core developer and architect of SELF Platform. He is currently guiding four research scholars in the area of science education at HBCSE, TIFR.
During the pandemic, Nagarjuna was part of the Collaboratively Understanding Biology Education program at the Homi Bhabha Center for Science Education (Tata Institute of Fundamental Research), which supported student learning at home through CUBE Home labs.

Free Software Foundation 
Nagarjuna is an active member of the Free Software Foundation in India. 
He is one of the speakers for the FSF. 
He is a founding member, current chairperson and the member of the board of directors for the Free Software Foundation of India.

History and Philosophy of Science 
Nagarjuna has interest in History and Philosophy of Science. He has created an illustrated exhibition on History of Science at Homi Bhabha Centre for Science Education.
He also teaches graduate courses in History and Philosophy of Science at Homi Bhabha Centre for science Education and Centre for Excellence in Basic Sciences.

References

External links

Official Page:
Gnowledge Portal:
Personal Blog:

Living people
20th-century Indian philosophers
Scholars from Andhra Pradesh
1960 births
People from Guntur district